Wishful Thinking is the 10th studio album by Earl Klugh released in 1984, and is the final album which Klugh recorded for Capitol Records. The album represents a summation of Klugh as a guitarist and composer, and features a variety of musical styles, including pop, classical, jazz, blues, reggae and funk. The songs are texturally orchestrated with strings and harps, conducted and arranged by Johnny Mandel, David Matthews and Grammy Award winner Don Sebesky. Saxophonist David Sanborn joins Klugh on the song "The Only One for Me" on alto saxophone.

Track listing 
"Wishful Thinking" - 3:58
"Tropical Legs" - 5:33
"All the Time" - 4:39
"A Natural Thing" - 2:55
"Once Again" - 4:18
"Take It from the Top" - 3:58
"The Only One for Me" - 4:49
"Right from the Start" - 5:30

Charts

Pop Culture 
"Take It from the Top" from Earl Klugh's 1984 album, Wishful Thinking, was used as the theme for CBS Sports' PGA Tour coverage from 1985 through 1990.

References 

1984 albums
Earl Klugh albums
Albums arranged by David Matthews (keyboardist)
Albums arranged by Johnny Mandel
Albums arranged by Don Sebesky